W5, W-5 or W.5 may refer to:

Arts, entertainment and media 
 W5 (TV program), a Canadian television news program
 Nick News W/5, the original title of Nick News, an educational TV show

Science and technology
 W5 (nuclear warhead) of the Mark 5 nuclear bomb
 W5 clock, built by Philip Woodward
 W5, a Motorola ROKR mobile phone
 W5, a radio source in the Westerhout 5 nebula
 W5, in the classification of meteorite weathering
 DSC-W5, a Sony Cyber-shot camera
 Eutelsat W5, a telecommunications satellite

Transportation and military
 Albatros W.5, a World War I German floatplane torpedo bomber
 Cierva W.5, a British helicopter from 1938
 Wittman W-5 Buttercup, a 1938 aircraft
 London bus route W5
 Roewe W5, a Chinese car 
 W5 series of road signs in the United States
 W5, a station of the Hiroden Hakushima Line in Hiroshima, Japan
 W5, IATA airline code for Mahan Air
 W5 tram, a class of electric trams built by the Melbourne & Metropolitan Tramways Board
 W5, station code for Hamilton E. Holmes station

Other uses
 Five Ws: Who? What? When? Where? and Why?
 "Which Was What Was Wanted", an alternative to Q.E.D.
 W5, part of Odyssey Complex, a sports and entertainment complex in Belfast, Northern Ireland
 W5, a postcode district in the W postcode area of London 
 W.5, Asholt Wood, Kent, a Nature Conservation Review site
 World version W5, a kickboxing promotion

See also

 5W (disambiguation)